Pulao may refer to:
 Pilaf, a rice dish consumed mainly in Central Asia, South Asia and the Middle East
 Pulao (dragon), a small dragon that appears as a decoration on Chinese bells

See also
 Palao (disambiguation)
 Pulau (disambiguation)